Zakaria Yehya Charara (born 1 January 1986) is a Lebanese former professional footballer who played as a left midfielder.

Club career
Charara started his youth career with Nejmeh on 14 August 1999, before being promoted to the first team ahead of the 2005–06 season. In 2010 he moved to Jordan's Al-Karmel where he played couple of matches. The same year, Charara moved to Al-Shabab in Bahrain.

In August 2011, he signed with Cypriot First Division side Ermis Aradippou for the 2011–12 season. He debuted for Ermis in a 0–0 draw against Ethnikos Achna on 10 September.

Zakaria joined 2011 Malaysia Super League champions Kelantan FA on 6 December 2011, signing a two-year contract. However, due to lack of playing time with Kelantan, Charara went on a loan until the rest of the season to fellow-Malaysian Super League side Kuala Lumpur FA. He scored his first league goal on 5 May 2012, converting a penalty in a 1–1 draw with Sarawak FA.

Following the 2012 Malaysia Super League, Zakaria re-joined Nejmeh. He made his debut on 29 September 2012 against Chabab Ghazieh.

International career
Zakaria made his debut for the Lebanon national team in 2009. He scored once, in a friendly against Namibia. His last match was against South Korea in 2012.

Career statistics

International
Scores and results list Lebanon's goal tally first.

Honours
Individual
 Lebanese Premier League Team of the Season: 2008–09

References

External links
 
 
 

1986 births
Living people
Lebanese footballers
Footballers from Beirut
Association football midfielders
Lebanese Premier League players
Nejmeh SC players
Lebanese expatriate footballers
Expatriate footballers in Jordan
Lebanese expatriate sportspeople in Jordan
Expatriate footballers in Bahrain
Lebanese expatriate sportspeople in Bahrain
Bahraini Premier League players
Expatriate footballers in Cyprus
Lebanese expatriate sportspeople in Cyprus
Cypriot First Division players
Ermis Aradippou FC players
Expatriate footballers in Malaysia
Lebanese expatriate sportspeople in Malaysia
Malaysia Premier League players
Kelantan FA players
Kuala Lumpur City F.C. players
Akhaa Ahli Aley FC players
Expatriate footballers in Iraq
Lebanese expatriate sportspeople in Iraq
Safa SC players
Sagesse SC footballers
Lebanon international footballers
Lebanon youth international footballers
Jordanian Pro League players
Lebanese Second Division players